Jean-Pierre Eychenne is a retired French make-up artist. He is best known for his work on the film Cyrano de Bergerac (1990), for which he was nominated for an Academy Award and won a BAFTA Award.

Awards and nominations

Academy Awards

British Academy Film Awards

References

External links
 

Living people
Best Makeup BAFTA Award winners
French make-up artists
Year of birth missing (living people)